Mehrdad Oladi (May 25, 1985 – April 19, 2016) was an Iranian footballer who most recently played for Persepolis, Esteghlal, Naft Tehran, Malavan in the Iran Pro League. He usually played in the striker position.

Club career

Start with Persepolis
Mehrdad Oladi started his career at IPL giants Persepolis before moving to Dubai outfit Al-Shabab for one season. In August 2006, he returned to Persepolis on a loan deal but moved back to Al-Shabab in March 2007 where he still had one year left of his two-year deal to serve.

He scored the winning goal in 61st match of Tehran derby on 3 November 2006 against Esteghlal, rivals of Persepolis. There had been interest shown by many Turkish and other European teams towards Oladi and his Iranian compatriot Mehrzad Madanchi.

Loan return to Persepolis
In September 2007, Oladi cancelled his contract with Al-Shabab and urgently went to the United States to deal with a family matter.

He returned to the United Arab Emirates in February 2008 and signed a six-month contract with Al-Shabab. In August 2012, Oladi was on trial with La Liga side, Xerez CD but move was cancelled.

He joined Malavan in the summer of 2009. Alongside Pejman Nouri, they had two great seasons with Malavan, reaching the final of the Hazfi Cup. He was the top scorer for Malavan with 15 goals in the 2010–11 season. In four games played in the Hazfi Cup, he scored five times.

Second return to Persepolis

He played two seasons for Malavan and moved to Persepolis in the summer of 2011 and was used as a winger and striker. He returned to Malavan after one season at Persepolis in 2012. On 6 July 2013, he signed with Naft Tehran with a contract running until 2015.

Esteghlal
He joined Esteghlal on 11 November 2013, with a one and half year contract.

Malavan
Oladi was released by Esteghlal in June 2014 and signed a contract with Malavan.

Club career statistics

Assist Goals

International career
Oladi was a member of Iran national under-20 football team, and participated in the 2004 AFC Youth Championship held in Malaysia. He scored 4 goals in the match against Indonesia, helping them win 6-2, but wasn't enough for Iran to advance to the second round. He was a part of the Iran national under-23 football team that participated at the 2006 Asian Games. He also participated with Iran B national football team in the 2005 Islamic Games in Saudi Arabia, where he won third place with his team, and became the top scorer in the tournament with 6 goals (4 of them in the 9-0 win against Tajikistan).

International goals
Scores and results list Iran's goal tally first.

Death
On 19 April 2016, Oladi died in Tehran's Tajrish Hospital at the age of 30 after suffering from cardiac complications.

Honours

Club
Al Shabab
UAE President's Cup: 2008-09 (Runner-up)

Malavan
Hazfi Cup: 2010-11 (Runner-up)

National
Iran U23
Asian Games Bronze Medal: 2006

References

External links 
 Mehrdad Oladi at PersianLeague.com
 Mehrdad Oladi at TeamMelli.com
 Mehrdad Oladi's Profile in 18ghadam.ir
 

1985 births
2016 deaths
Iranian footballers
Association football forwards
Persepolis F.C. players
Malavan players
Al Shabab Al Arabi Club Dubai players
Esteghlal F.C. players
Naft Tehran F.C. players
Iranian expatriate footballers
Iranian expatriate sportspeople in the United Arab Emirates
Expatriate footballers in the United Arab Emirates
Asian Games bronze medalists for Iran
Asian Games medalists in football
Footballers at the 2006 Asian Games
People from Qaem Shahr
Medalists at the 2006 Asian Games
Persian Gulf Pro League players
UAE Pro League players
Iran international footballers
Sportspeople from Mazandaran province